Manhattan Panorama is a live album led by saxophonist George Coleman recorded in 1985 at the Village Vanguard and released on the Theresa label.

Reception

In his review for AllMusic, Ron Wynn observed "Other than a good-natured but ultimately empty vocal, Coleman was routinely brilliant on every number during this live Village Vanguard set".

Track listing
All compositions by George Coleman except as indicated
 "Mayor Koch" - 3:28
 "New York Suite: I Love New York/Manhattan/How About You?/Harlem Nocturne/Autumn in New York/New York, New York" (Steve Karmen/Richard Rodgers, Lorenz Hart/Ralph Freed, Burton Lane/Earle Hagen, Dick Rogers/Vernon Duke/Fred Ebb, John Kander) - 19:12    
 "Subway Ride" - 6:09    
 "El Barrio" - 6:00    
 "New York Housing Blues" - 9:36    
 "Ray of Light" (Consuela Lee Morehead) - 15:04 Bonus track on CD reissue

Personnel
George Coleman - tenor saxophone, alto saxophone, vocals
Harold Mabern - piano   
Jamil Nasser - bass
Idris Muhammad - drums

References

1985 live albums
George Coleman live albums
Theresa Records live albums
Albums recorded at the Village Vanguard